Ohio Northern University (Ohio Northern or ONU) is a private college in Ada, Ohio. Founded by Henry Solomon Lehr in 1871, ONU is accredited by the Higher Learning Commission. It offers over 60 programs to choose from across five colleges and is affiliated with the United Methodist Church.

History

Early years

Henry Solomon Lehr founded the Northwestern Ohio Normal School in August 1871. When the college's curriculum grew to include pharmacy, engineering, law and business programs, its name was changed to Ohio Normal University and, eventually, in 1903, Ohio Northern University. In 1899, it became affiliated with the United Methodist Church to reduce debt.

Interwar and post-war education

Before the Great Depression, more than one thousand students were typically enrolled at Ohio Northern every year. Both the Great Depression and the following World War II plunged the school into low enrollment, and the possibility of closure was considered. During World War II, enrollment reached a low of 156 students. Thanks to the G.I. Bill, Ohio Northern was able to bring enrollment back up to nine hundred students by 1946.

Throughout the 1960s, a number of ONU students and faculty/staff participated in the American Civil Rights Movement. ONU hosted Dr. Martin Luther King Jr. on January 11, 1968, four days before his 39th birthday and just three months before his assassination. During his visit at ONU, King famously spoke regarding the myth that many immigrant and/or ethnic groups successfully pulled themselves up by their bootstraps, whereas African Americans were incapable of doing so. ONU honored King and his speech on campus with the unveiling of a statue in his likeness on April 17, 2018.

Later 20th century into today
Growth continued under Dr. DeBow Freed through the 1980s and 1990s with additions to the Taggart Law Library, Presser Hall, Dukes Memorial, Wilson Art Building, Biggs Engineering, Heterick Memorial Library, and Meyer Hall of Science, and the construction of the Freed Center for the Performing Arts and a new president's on-campus home. Under Dr. Kendall Baker, campus additions include Dicke Hall, an expansion of the Robertson-Evans Pharmacy building, the Dial-Roberson Stadium and the Mathile Center for the Natural Sciences. In 2008, Ohio Northern University built and opened The Inn at Ohio Northern University. A new engineering building was opened in October 2019.

In 2010, ONU announced that its board of trustees approved the nomination of Daniel A. DiBiasio, president of Wilmington College to become the new president of Ohio Northern; he assumed his duties on August 1, 2011. He was succeeded in 2022 by Melissa J. Baumann.

Academics

The institution comprises five colleges:
 Getty College of Arts and Sciences
 James F. Dicke College of Business Administration
 T.J. Smull College of Engineering
 Rudolph H. Raabe College of Pharmacy
 Claude W. Pettit College of Law (established 1885)

Prior to 1973, the law school was known as "the Warren G. Harding College of Law". It was renamed in honor of Claude W. Pettit, a judge and former dean of the college.

Athletics

ONU students participate in intercollegiate, intramural, and sports clubs in a variety of sports. The ONU Polar Bears compete in the NCAA Division III Ohio Athletic Conference (OAC). The men's volleyball team participates in the Midwest Intercollegiate Volleyball Association in the Great Midwest Men's Volleyball Conference.
 The school mascot is a polar bear named Klondike.
 The ONU varsity football team defeated Mount Union College in 2005 to snap the Purple Raiders 110-game regular season winning streak.
 The ONU women's volleyball team had an NCAA All-Divisions record 36 consecutive winning 

Men's sports
 Baseball
 Basketball
 Cross country
 Football
 Golf
 Lacrosse
 Soccer
 Swimming
 Tennis
 Track & field
 Wrestling

Women's sports
 Basketball
 Cross country
 Golf
 Lacrosse
 Soccer
 Softball
 Swimming
 Tennis
 Track & field
 Volleyball

National honors

NCAA Championship
 1993 Men's Basketball NCAA Division III Champions

NCAA Runner-up finishes
 1989 Women's Volleyball NCAA Division III Runners-up
 2012 Men's Soccer NCAA Division III Runners-up

NCAA Final Four appearances
 2001 Men's Basketball NCAA Division III Final Four
 2008 Women's Volleyball NCAA Division III Final Four

NCAA Elite Eight appearance
 2017 Women's Basketball
NCAA Sweet Sixteen appearances
 1999 Football 
 2000 Football 
 2010 Football 
 2015 Football
 2019 Women's Soccer

Club Sport Championship
 2007 Men's Volleyball NIRSA Division II National Champions

Notable alumni
 Anthony Alaimo, jurist
 Frank T. Bow, jurist and politician who was honored by naming the Frank T. Bow Federal Building in Canton, Ohio.
 James Cloyd Bowman, a children's book author who received a Newbery Honor in 1938 for Pecos Bill: The Greatest Cowboy of All Time.
 Benjamin Brafman, a prominent criminal defense attorney based in New York.
 William J. Brown, former Ohio Attorney General (1971–1983).
 Anthony J. Celebrezze, Secretary of Health, Education, and Welfare under the Kennedy and Johnson administrations, the 49th Mayor of Cleveland, and a Sixth Circuit Appellate Judge
 George Washington Crile, founder of the Cleveland Clinic and inventor of the system for blood transfusion
 Robert R. Cupp, former Ohio Supreme Court Justice
 Mike DeWine, Governor of Ohio
 Simeon Davison Fess, a Republican politician a former president of Antioch College
 George Getty, American lawyer, father of industrialist J. Paul Getty and patriarch of the Getty family
 John W. Grabiel, Arkansas Republican gubernatorial nominee in 1922 and 1924; Ohio native, attorney in Fayetteville, Arkansas, until his death in 1928
 Stephanie L. Haines, United States federal judge
 Stacey Hairston, former Cleveland Browns player
 Thomas Hutson, doctor and medical researcher
 Robert Franklin Jones, served as Allen County (Ohio) prosecuting attorney, 1935–1939. Elected in 1938 to the Seventy-sixth U.S. Congress, and elected for three subsequent terms to Congress, serving from 1939 to 1947. Appointed commissioner of the Federal Communications Commission, serving from 1947 to 1952
 J.E. Keeny, studied music at Ohio Northern. Served as president of Louisiana Tech University, 1908–1926
 George E. Killian, a sports administrator and a president of the International University Sports Federation
 Cassius Jackson Keyser, a mathematician
 Carla F. Kim, Associate Professor of Genetics at Harvard Medical School and Principal Investigator at the Stem Cell Program at Boston Children's Hospital
 Cheryl L. Mason, Chairman of the Board of Veterans' Appeals, US Department of Veterans' Affairs (first woman appointed to the position)
 Clay Mathile, former owner of Iams pet food
 Harry McNeal, Major League baseball player
 Bill Peterson, former head football coach at Florida State, Rice University, and with the Houston Oilers
 Bob Peterson, story artist, animator and voice actor
 Tom Reed, United States Congressman from New York
 Joseph Banks Rhine, founder of the parapsychology lab at Duke University
 Nate Riles, retired CFL player
 Jamal Robertson, retired NFL football player
 Ralph L. Ropp (class of 1923), president of Louisiana Tech University from 1949 to 1962
 Baldemar Velasquez, is president of the Farm Labor Organizing Committee, AFL–CIO
 Jason Trusnik, retired NFL football player. Owner of Pro Sports Performance in Strongsville, OH
 Steve Vagedes, former Arena Football League player
 Jim Wilson, Los Angeles city council member, studied pharmacy

References

External links 

 
WONB "The Beat" (now a webcaster)

 
Private universities and colleges in Ohio
Ohio Northern University
Universities and colleges affiliated with the United Methodist Church
Educational institutions established in 1871
Buildings and structures in Hardin County, Ohio
Tourist attractions in Hardin County, Ohio
1871 establishments in Ohio
Ada, Ohio